The North Las Vegas Fire Department is the agency that provides fire protection and emergency medical services for the city of North Las Vegas, Nevada. All 911 calls go through the multi-agency Fire Alarm Office (FAO) located at the Las Vegas Fire & Rescue Department Headquarters (Station 1).  The Fire Alarm Office serves as dispatch for the NLVFD as well as the Clark County Fire Department and the Las Vegas Fire & Rescue Department. The use of Computer-aided dispatch allows for the determination of the nearest unit, even if that unit responds from a neighboring department. Thus an engine from the Clark County Fire Department may respond into North Las Vegas mutual aid as the system determines that they are closer.

In 2012, the NLVFD responded to 24,545 emergencies which resulted in a total of 31,947 unit responses with an average response time of 5 minutes and 17 seconds.

USAR Task Force 

The NLVFD is a member of Nevada Task Force 1 (NVTF-1), one of 28 Federal Emergency Management Agency (FEMA) Urban Search and Rescue Task Forces (USAR-TF) that are prepared to respond to state or federal disasters throughout the United States. The task force team is deployed by FEMA for the rescue of victims of structural collapses due to man-made or natural disasters.

MGM Grand Fire 

On November 21, 1980 the MGM Grand Hotel and Casino (now Bally's Las Vegas) in Paradise, Nevada suffered a major fire. The fire killed 85 people, most through smoke inhalation. The NLVFD was one of the main agencies to respond to the fire which remains the worst disaster in Nevada history, and the third-worst hotel fire in modern U.S. history.

Stations & Apparatus
The NLVFD is an all-hazards department that provides emergency response from eight fire stations using six engines, two trucks, four ALS rescues, two ILS rescues, an air/light resource unit, an ALS Squad, a brush engine and two Battalion Chiefs along with a variety of support units.

References 

Fire departments in Nevada
North Las Vegas, Nevada